Harrisville is a city in Weber County, Utah, United States. The population was 5,567 at the 2010 census. It is part of the Ogden–Clearfield, Utah Metropolitan Statistical Area. The current mayor is Michelle Tait.

History
The first permanent settlement at Harrisville was made in 1850. A post office called Harrisville was established in 1871, and remained in operation until 1902. The community was named after Martin H. Harris, a pioneer settler.

Geography
According to the United States Census Bureau, the city has a total area of 2.7 square miles (7.0 km2), all land.

Demographics

As of the census of 2000, there were 3,645 people, 1,010 households, and 884 families residing in the city. The population density was 1,347.6 people per square mile (521.2/km2). There were 1,036 housing units at an average density of 383.0 per square mile (148.1/km2). The racial makeup of the city was 93.77% White, 0.41% African American, 0.41% Native American, 1.15% Asian, 0.36% Pacific Islander, 2.33% from other races, and 1.56% from two or more races. Hispanic or Latino of any race were 4.66% of the population.

There were 1,010 households, out of which 58.5% had children under 18 living with them, 77.5% were married couples living together, 7.4% had a female householder with no husband present, and 12.4% were non-families. 10.3% of all households were made up of individuals, and 3.3% had someone living alone who was 65 years of age or older. The average household size was 3.61, and the average family size was 3.89.

In the city, the population was spread out, with 39.3% under 18, 10.2% from 18 to 24, 30.5% from 25 to 44, 15.5% from 45 to 64, and 4.5% who were 65 years of age or older. The median age was 26 years. For every 100 females, there were 102.4 males. For every 100 females aged 18 and over, there were 100.9 males.

The median income for a household in the city was $51,289, and the median income for a family was $53,396. Males had a median income of $38,287 versus $29,239 for females. The per capita income was $16,293. About 2.6% of families and 3.6% of the population were below the poverty line, including 5.2% of those under age 18 and 3.8% of those aged 65 or over.

Federal Representation 
Harrisville is located in Utah's First Congressional District
For the 117th United States Congress, Utah's First Congressional District is represented by Blake Moore (R Ogden)

See also

 List of cities and towns in Utah

References

External links

 

Cities in Utah
Cities in Weber County, Utah
Ogden–Clearfield metropolitan area
Populated places established in 1850